They Shall Not Grow Old is a 2018 documentary film directed and produced by Peter Jackson. The film was created using original footage of the First World War from the Imperial War Museum's archives, most previously unseen, all over 100 years old by the time of release. Audio is from BBC and Imperial War Museum (IWM) interviews of British servicemen who fought in the conflict. Most of the footage has been colourised and transformed with modern production techniques, with the addition of sound effects and voice acting to be more evocative and feel closer to the soldiers' actual experiences.

It is Jackson's first documentary as director. Jackson, whose grandfather (to whom the film is dedicated) fought in the war, intended for the film to be an immersive experience of "what it was like to be a soldier" rather than a story or a recount of events. The crew reviewed 600 hours of interviews from 200 veterans and 100 hours of original film footage to make the film. The title was inspired by the line "They shall grow not old, as we that are left grow old" from the 1914 poem "For the Fallen" by Laurence Binyon, famous for being used in the Ode of Remembrance.

They Shall Not Grow Old premiered simultaneously at the BFI London Film Festival and in selected cinemas in the UK on 16 October 2018, before airing on BBC Two on 11 November 2018 (the hundredth anniversary of the Armistice of 11 November 1918); it received a limited US release on 17 December. Following its box office success, the film received a wide theatrical release in February 2019 (the film's theatrical release was handled by Warner Bros. Pictures). It was acclaimed by critics for its restoration work, immersive atmosphere and portrayal of war, and earned a nomination for the BAFTA Award for Best Documentary.

Production 
The film was co-commissioned by 14–18 NOW and Imperial War Museums in association with the BBC, who approached Jackson in 2015 for the project. According to Jackson, to make the film, the crew of They Shall Not Grow Old reviewed 600 hours of interviews from the BBC and the IWM and 100 hours of original film footage from the IWM. The interviews came from 200 veterans, with the audio from 120 of them being used in the film. After receiving the footage, Jackson decided that the film would not feature traditional narration and that it would instead only feature audio excerpts of the soldiers talking about their war memories, in order to make the film about the soldiers themselves; for the same reason, it barely features any dates or named locations.

Jackson stated: "We made a decision not to identify the soldiers as the film happened. There were so many of them that names would be popping up on the screen every time a voice appeared. In a way it became an anonymous and agnostic film. We also edited out any references to dates and places, because I didn’t want the movie to be about this day here or that day there. There's hundreds of books about all that stuff. I wanted the film to be a human experience and be agnostic in that way. ... I didn't want individual stories about individuals. I wanted it to be what it ended up being: 120 men telling a single story. Which is: what was it like to be a British soldier on the western front?" In another interview, he stated "[The men] saw a war in colour, they certainly didn't see it in black and white. I wanted to reach through the fog of time and pull these men into the modern world, so they can regain their humanity once more – rather than be seen only as Charlie Chaplin-type figures in the vintage archive film." Jackson's own paternal grandfather, Sgt. William Jackson, to whom the film is dedicated, was British and fought in the First World War; Peter grew up with his father telling him his grandfather's war stories. Jackson stated that after making the film, he now had "a greater understanding of what my grandfather would have gone through".

Jackson did not receive any fee for the making of the film. Although only a small part of it was used, Jackson's crew visually restored all 100 hours of footage the Imperial War Museums sent them for free, "just to get their archive in better shape".

It was produced by WingNut Films with House Productions as executive producers and was supported by the UK's National Lottery through the Heritage Lottery Fund and the Department for Digital, Culture, Media and Sport.

Music
The music was composed by New Zealand trio Plan 9, consisting of David Donaldson, Steve Roche and Janet Roddick.

The closing credits of the film feature an extended version of the song "Mademoiselle from Armentières", which was particularly popular during the war. Jackson decided late in the production to use the song and there was little time to assemble the performers. Rather than have non-British men try to sing in British accents, native speakers in service to the UK government were recruited from the British High Commission in New Zealand.

Release 
The film premiered on 16 October 2018 as a Special Presentation at the BFI London Film Festival, in the presence of Prince William, Duke of Cambridge, while also being released in several selected cinemas across the country; copies were also sent to UK schools the same day. The film was simultaneously screened in 2D and 3D at cinemas, schools and special venues across the UK. The simulcast included a special post-screening Q&A with Jackson, hosted by the film critic Mark Kermode.

The film was broadcast on BBC Two on 11 November 2018, the one-hundredth anniversary of the Armistice of 11 November 1918. To accompany the film, a special episode of the documentary series What Do Artists Do All Day? which followed Peter Jackson making the film aired the following day on BBC Four.

The film received a special United States release through Fathom Events in 2D and 3D, on 17 and 27 December 2018. Warner Bros. launched a theatrical release in New York, Los Angeles and Washington, DC, on 11 January 2019 with plans to expand to 25 markets on 1 February. Because it missed the 1 October 2018 filing deadline, the film was deemed ineligible for consideration for the Academy Award for Best Documentary Feature at the 91st Academy Awards; because it is still a 2018 film, it was also ineligible for the ceremony the following year.

Reception

Box office
They Shall Not Grow Old has grossed $18 million in the United States and Canada, and $2.5 million in other territories, for a total worldwide gross of $20.4 million.

In the United States, the film was screened as part of a one-day presentation through Fathom Events on 17 December 2018 and grossed $2.3 million, setting a record for a documentary showing through the company. Encore screenings were held on December 27, making $3.4 million from two showtimes at 1,122 cinemas. It was the highest-grossing single-day total ever for a documentary playing via Fathom, and one of the top-grossing single-day presentations of any kind from the company. On Martin Luther King Jr. Day, the film grossed an additional $2.6 million from 1,335 cinemas. The film had a general release in 735 cinemas on 1 February 2019 and made $2.4 million, finishing 10th.

Critical response 
The website's critical consensus reads, "An impressive technical achievement with a walloping emotional impact, They Shall Not Grow Old pays brilliant cinematic tribute to the sacrifice of a generation." On Metacritic, which assigns a normalised rating based on reviews, the film has a weighted average score of 91 out of 100 based on 26 critics, indicating "universal acclaim"; it is labeled as a "Metacritic must-see".

Giving the film a five-star rating, Peter Bradshaw in his review for The Guardian called it "a visually staggering thought experiment", saying "The effect is electrifying. The soldiers are returned to an eerie, hyperreal kind of life in front of our eyes, like ghosts or figures summoned up in a seance. The faces are unforgettable. ... The details are harrowing, as is the political incorrectness of what the soldiers recall: some express their candid enjoyment of the war, others their utter desensitisation to what they experienced."

Guy Lode of Variety called the film "a technical dazzler with a surprisingly humane streak", stating "if They Shall Not Grow Old is head-spinning for its jolting animation of creakily shot battle scenes—tricked out with ingeniously integrated sound editing and seamlessly re-timed from 13 frames a second to 24—its greatest revelation isn't one of sound and fury. Rather, it's the film's faces that stick longest in the mind. Through the exhaustive transformation completed by Jackson's team, visages that were all but indistinguishably blurred in the archives take on shape, character and creases of worry, terror and occasional hilarity. In conjunction with the film's intricately stitched narration, its soldiers turn from cold statistics to warm, quivering human beings, drawing us with renewed empathy into a Great War that, they all but unanimously agree, had precious little greatness to it."

Stephen Dalton of The Hollywood Reporter stated that the film "suggests new cinematic methods of rescuing history from history books, humanizing and dramatizing true stories with a modest injection of movie-world artifice. Some critics may object to how Jackson streamlines and elides real events, stripping away specifics while offering no broader socio-political comment on the war. But as an immersive primer on the first-hand experiences of British soldiers, this innovative documentary is a haunting, moving and consistently engaging lesson in how to bring the past vividly alive." Mike McCahill of IndieWire gave the film a B grade, considering that "the filmmaker's extensive restoration project doesn't always provide new insights, but it succeeds at creating a fresh look at the horrors of WWI."

The response was not universally positive however, and particularly among archivists and film historians some concerns were raised about the ways in which the film erased the original filmmakers, manipulated the image through colourization and other techniques and implied that the original footage (much of which had been extensively restored by the IWM archives) was in disrepair.

See also 
World War II in HD Colour, a 2008 TV series comprising colourised footage of the Second World War

References

External links 

 
 
 

2018 3D films
2018 documentary films
2018 films
British 3D films
British documentary films
Documentary films about World War I
Films directed by Peter Jackson
WingNut Films films
3D documentary films
Warner Bros. films
2010s English-language films
2010s British films
Films produced by Peter Jackson
English-language documentary films